Greece and Ukraine have deep ties due to Orthodox Christianity and enjoy strong diplomatic relations, due to Greece’s active diplomatic support for Ukraine over the Annexation of Crimea by the Russian Federation.
Greece is also one of the main supporters of Ukraine’s entry into NATO and the European Union.
Greece recognized Ukraine on December 31, 1991. Both countries established diplomatic relations in 1992. Greece opened an embassy in Kyiv in 1993, general-consulates were set up in Mariupol and Odesa. Ukraine has opened an embassy in Athens and since April 2004 a general-consulate in Thessaloniki.
Both countries are full members of the Organization for Security and Co-operation in Europe and of the Organization of the Black Sea Economic Cooperation. There is a large Greek community living in Ukraine (mostly in the southern and eastern regions of the nation). Ukraine was first settled by the Greeks as early as 500 B.C. The Ukrainian city of Odesa (among others) was founded by ancient Greek colonists, being also the place where the Filiki Eteria secret organization was founded.

List of bilateral agreements
 Friendship and Cooperation Agreement between the Hellenic Republic and Ukraine (1997).
 Agreement on Economic, Industrial, Scientific and Technological Cooperation.
 Agreement on the Promotion and Mutual Protection of Investments.
 Agreement on the Avoidance of Double Taxation
 Agreement on International Road Transport.
 Shipping Agreement.
 Agreement on Judicial Assistance in Civil Matters.

List of bilateral visits 
 November 1996, President of Ukraine, Leonid Kuchma visited Greece
 December 1997, President of Greece, Konstantinos Stephanopoulos visited Ukraine
 April 2001, Prime Minister of Ukraine, Viktor Yushchenko visited Greece
 July 2002, Prime Minister of Greece, Costas Simitis visited Ukraine
 September 2007, President of Ukraine, Viktor Yushchenko visited Greece
 April 2008, President of Greece, Karolos Papoulias visited Ukraine
 October 2011, President of Ukraine, Viktor Yanukovych visited Greece

Ambassadors of Greece in Ukraine

 Vasilios Patsikakis (1993-1998)
 Dimitris Contoumas (1998-2002)
 Panayotis Gumas (2002-2006)
 Dimitriou Haralambos (2006-2009)
 Georgios Georgountzos (2009–present)

Diplomacy

Hellenic Republic
Kyiv (Embassy)
Mariupol (Consulate-General) 
Odesa (Consulate-General)

Ukraine
Athens (Embassy)
Thessaloniki (Consulate-General)

See also
Foreign relations of Greece
Foreign relations of Ukraine
Greeks in Ukraine

Notes

External links
Greek Ministry of Foreign Affairs about the relation with Ukraine
 Greek embassy in Kyiv
 Ukrainian embassy in Athens

 
Ukraine
Greece